Georges Appert (1850–1934) was a French historian, academic, writer and Japanologist.  He was a legal scholar and professor of law at the University of Tokyo.

Career
Appert was a foreign government advisor in Meiji Japan from 1879 to 1889.

Select works
In an overview of writings by and about Appert, OCLC/WorldCat lists roughly 26 works in 43 publications in 5 languages and 132 library holdings.

  Ancien Japon, 1888
 Du terme en droit romain et en droit français, 1876
 Dictionnaire des termes de droit, d'économie politique et d'administration, 1885
 日本立法資料全集 (Japanese legislation Complete Works). 別卷 337, 佛國相續法講義, 2005
 Un code de la féodalité Japonaise au XIIIe siècle, 1900
 理財学講義 (Lecture notes in chrematistics), 1884 
 経済学講義 (Economics lecture), 1883

References

External links
 
法政大学の歴史（その72）「ジョルジュ・アペール（Georges Victor Appert）―草創期のフランス人教師」  (Japanese)

1850 births
1934 deaths
French Japanologists
19th-century French historians
20th-century French historians
Foreign advisors to the government in Meiji-period Japan
Academic staff of the University of Tokyo
French male non-fiction writers
19th-century French male writers
French expatriates in Japan